The 2019–20 UT Arlington Mavericks men's basketball team represented the University of Texas at Arlington in the 2019–20 NCAA Division I men's basketball season. The Mavericks, led by second-year head coach Chris Ogden, played their home games at the College Park Center in Arlington, Texas as members of the Sun Belt Conference. They finished the season 14–18, 10–10 in Sun Belt play to finish seventh place. They lost in the first round of the Sun Belt tournament to Coastal Carolina.

Previous season
The Mavericks finished the 2018–19 season 17–16, 12–6 in Sun Belt play to finish in a tie for 2nd place. In the Sun Belt tournament, they defeated Georgia Southern in the semifinals, advancing to the championship game, where they were defeated by Georgia State.

Roster

Schedule and results

|-
!colspan=12 style=| Non-conference regular season

|-
!colspan=9 style=| Sun Belt Conference regular season

|-
!colspan=12 style=| Sun Belt tournament
|-

|-

Source

References

UT Arlington Mavericks men's basketball seasons
UT Arlington Mavericks
UT Arlington Mavericks men's basketball
UT Arlington Mavericks men's basketball